Justice Horton may refer to:

Albert H. Horton, chief justice of the Kansas Supreme Court
Joel D. Horton, associate justice of the Idaho Supreme Court
Sherman D. Horton Jr., associate justice of the New Hampshire Supreme Court